James William Blacklock (31 July 1855 – 21 April 1907) was a New Zealand cricketer. He played in seven first-class matches for Wellington from 1877 to 1884.

See also
 List of Wellington representative cricketers

References

External links
 

1855 births
1907 deaths
New Zealand cricketers
Wellington cricketers
Cricketers from Melbourne